Arthur Aloysius "Hec" Garvey (February 20, 1900 — September 23, 1973) was a professional American football offensive lineman. He played for 9 teams  in 3 leagues (APFA, NFL, AFL) over 9 seasons.

References

1900 births
Akron Pros players
Chicago Bears players
Brooklyn Lions players
Waterbury Blues players
New York Giants players
Providence Steam Roller players
Brooklyn Dodgers (NFL) players
Staten Island Stapletons players
Notre Dame Fighting Irish football players
1973 deaths